"Bombscare" is a track from the 1991 album Hold It Down by 2 Bad Mice.

It makes heavy use of samples, taking drumbeats then chopping and rearranging them to create a distinctive musical style.  The main sample heard is from the song "Don't Mess with This Beat" by Neon; other samples for the breakbeat are from "Let Me Love You (Rebuilt)" by Kariya.

A single was released in the UK in 1996 featuring several remixes of the song. It peaked at No. 46 on the UK Singles Chart.

Alexis Petridis, writing for The Guardian in 2020, listed "Bombscare" at number one in his list of his 25 best early '90s breakbeat hardcore tracks.

References

External links
 Hold It Down (Discogs.com)

1991 songs
1991 singles
Breakbeat hardcore songs